Tetsuo Sōkatsu (1870–1954) was a Japanese Rinzai-master. He was a dharma heir of Soyen Shaku.

Biography
Tetsuo Sokatsu received dharma transmission from Soyen Shaku at the age of 29. There-after he traveled throughout Japan, on "a pilgrimage of great Zen temples". Sokatsu continued his travels outside Japan for two years, visiting Burma, Ceylon and India, where he lived with "barefoot sadhus".

Soyen Shaku put him in charge of Ryōbō Kai, and gave him the hermitage-name "Ryobo-an". Sokatsu opened the hermitage for lay-practice, opening up the possibility of dharma transmission to lay practitioners. At the end of World War II Sokatsu closed Ryōbō Kai, but the lay practice was continued by his dharma heir Koun-an Roshi.

In 1906 Sokatsu went to California with a group of fourteen students, including Gotō Zuigan and Sokei-an Shigetsu Sasaki. He stayed there for four years, Sokei-an Sasaki being the only one to stay in the USA.

Dharma heirs
 Gotō Zuigan, abbot of Daitoku-ji, teacher of Huston Smith, Walter Nowick
 Koun-an Tatsuta Eizan Roshi, founder of Ningen Zen Kyodan
 Sokei-an Sasaki, husband of Ruth Fuller Sasaki

See also
 Buddhism in the United States
 Timeline of Zen Buddhism in the United States

References

Sources

External links
 

Zen in the United States
Japanese Buddhist clergy
Rinzai Buddhists
1900s in California
1906 in California
1870 births
1954 deaths